The 2016–17 season is the 33rd season in the history of Aizawl Football Club and their second in the I-League, India's top flight professional football league. The season began on 1 August 2016 and will conclude in May 2017. The club ended the I-League campaign as the champions after they were reinstated into the league after they were relegated the previous season. The club will also participate in the Federation Cup while they also made it to the semi-finals of the Mizoram Premier League and the Durand Cup.

Due to I-League regulations, despite finishing the season in 9th, over bottom placed DSK Shivajians, Aizawl were still relegated from the league in 2015–16. However, due to the withdrawal of the Goan clubs, Dempo, Salgaocar, and Sporting Goa, the club were reinstated into the league. The club brought in Khalid Jamil as the head coach who replaced caretaker Jahar Das. Jamil brought with him two of his former players from his previous club Mumbai in Ashutosh Mehta and Jayesh Rane. He also had the club sign goalkeeper Albino Gomes on loan from Mumbai City. In the foreigners department, the club retained Alfred Jaryan while also signing former Syria international Mahmoud Amnah as well as defender Kingsley Obumneme and forward Kamo Stephane Bayi.

The club started the season by participating in the Durand Cup and Mizoram Premier League, the top football league in their home state of Mizoram. Jamil, as well as the new player signings, were not with the club during these tournaments. The club made it to the semi-finals of the Durand Cup before being eliminated by Army Green. Aizawl then finished the regular season of the Mizoram Premier League in third place, qualifying for the league semi-finals. They took on Chanmari, losing both legs of the tie 4–1 and 2–1 respectively. Once Jamil and the new players arrived, the club prepared for the I-League season. Aizawl started the season strong, winning three of their opening five matches in January. The club then won four of their six matches in February and four of their last seven matches to win the title. The title was confirmed on the final game of the season against Shillong Lajong in a 1–1 draw.

Background

Aizawl earned the promotion to 2015–16 I-League by winning 2015 I-League 2nd Division. In spite of spirited performances, Aizawl ended up at the bottom of table and were scheduled to be relegated. However, due to withdrawal of Goan clubs, Aizawl given another opportunity to play in I-League.

Squad changes

In

Out

Loan in

Durand Cup

Aizawl were drawn in Group B with Indian Air Force, Dempo, Army Red, NEROCA, and Real Kashmir. With three wins, a draw and a loss, Aizawl topped the group and qualified for the semi-finals. However, they lost to eventual champions Army Green in penalty shoot-out, after the game ended 3–3 after the extra time.
Group B

Semi-final

Mizoram Premier League

After participating in the Durand Cup Aizawl returned to Mizoram to take part in the fifth season of the Mizoram Premier League, the top football league in the state. Aizawl opened their campaign on 15 September 2016 against Zo United at the AR Lammual Stadium. They took the lead early in the third minute through a penalty won by foreign import Bright Middleton and converted by Lalramchullova. Brandon Vanlalremdika doubled Aizawl's advantage right before halftime through a volley from outside the box and William Lalnunfela finished Zo United off in the 82nd minute as Aizawl won 3–0. Aizawl succumbed to their first defeat of the season in their second match against Chanmari. Former Aizawl player Malsawmfela scored the only goal of the match as Aizawl fell 1–0. Two days later, Aizawl suffered their second consecutive defeat when they lost 1–0 to Bethlehem VT. Lalrammuanpuia scored the only goal of the match for Bethlehem VT. Following the two defeats, Aizawl looked to turn things around against Chhinga Veng. Despite going down early in the fourth minute through Vanlallawma, late goals from Lalramchullova and Lalnuntluanga helped Aizawl comeback to win 2–1. The side then ended the month with a 0–0 draw against bottom placed Dinthar.

Matches

Table

Semi-finals
Leg 1

Leg 2

I-League

Before I-League, Aizawl hired former Indian international and Mumbai F.C. coach, Khalid Jamil.

January
Aizawl began their I-League campaign against the title-contenders East Bengal F.C. on 7 January 2017. Aizawl took the lead towards the end of the first half with Gurwinder Singh's own goal, however Ivan Bukenya's last minute strike salvaged a point for the hosts. In the first home game of the season, against I-League debutant Minerva Punjab F.C., Aizawl seemed to be heading for another draw until Loveday Enyinnaya's own goal in the stoppage time earned them a win.

Matches

League table

Federation Cup

Group stage
Aizawl were drawn with East Bengal, Chennai City and Churchill Brothers in Group A. Aizawl took on Chennai City in the opening game. Aizawl were trailing by 2 goals at the end of the first half, but came back strongly in the second half to score 3 goals and win the game. Aizawl took an early lead in the second game against Churchill Brothers, but in the closing minutes Churchill Brothers earned a penalty and converted. Aizawl fought back to score the winner in the 90th minute and secured a spot in the semi-finals. In the dead-rubber game against East Bengal neither team managed a goal and split a point each and Aizawl topped the group.
Group A

Semi-finals
In the semi-final, Aizawl faced Group B runner-up, Bengaluru FC. Aizawl conceded the lead in the 8th minute when Alwyn George was fouled inside the box and Bengaluru were awarded the penalty and Cameron Watson successfully converted the penalty. Bengaluru had more scoring opportunities but could not extend their lead. Aizawl were given the penalty seconds before the final whistle, but Amrinder Singh saved Lalramchullova and ended Aizawl's Federation Cup campaign.

Aftermath
End of the season awards by I-League, Khalid Jamil won the  Syed Abdul Rahim Best Coach award and Alfred Jaryan won the Best Midfielder award.

Technical staff

Player statistics

Appearances and goals
 
|-
! colspan=10 style=background:#dcdcdc; text-align:center| Goalkeepers

|-
! colspan=10 style=background:#dcdcdc; text-align:center| Defenders
|-

|-
! colspan=10 style=background:#dcdcdc; text-align:center| Midfielders
|-

|-
! colspan=10 style=background:#dcdcdc; text-align:center| Forwards
|-

Updated: 14 May 2017

Top scorers

Source: soccerway
Updated: 14 May 2017

Clean sheets

Source: soccerway
Updated: 14 May 2017

Disciplinary record

Source: soccerway
Updated: 14 May 2017

References

See also
 2016–17 in Indian football

Aizawl
Aizawl FC seasons